Andrés del Campo Santos (born 19 January 1980) is a Spanish retired footballer who played as an attacking midfielder.

He amassed Segunda División totals of 180 matches and 24 goals during six seasons, in representation of three clubs.

Football career
Santos was born in Madrid. An unsuccessful graduate of Real Madrid, he went on to play his first professional years in the third division, first with Hércules CF then with UE Lleida.

In the summer of 2007, after two second level seasons with the Catalans, with relegation in 2006, Santos moved to CD Tenerife on a two-year contract. However, after a successful season individually, he left the Canary Islands, staying in that tier with Elche CF.

Honours
Lleida
Segunda División B: 2003–04

References

External links

1980 births
Living people
Footballers from Madrid
Spanish footballers
Association football midfielders
Segunda División players
Segunda División B players
Tercera División players
Real Madrid C footballers
Real Madrid Castilla footballers
Hércules CF players
UE Lleida players
CD Tenerife players
Elche CF players
Ontinyent CF players